The Formosa Quartet is an American string quartet. The quartet won the First Prize and the Amadeus Prize at the Wigmore Hall International String Quartet Competition in 2006, and is committed to championing the indigenous music of under-represented cultures, and to stretching the boundaries of string quartet expression.

The Quartet premiered Taiwanese-American composer Shih-Hui Chen's Returning Souls: Four Pieces on Three Formosan Amis Legends in 2014, and the Quartet's recording of its first commission from Ms. Chen, Fantasia on the Theme of Plum Blossom, was released on the New World Records label in 2013.

From 2014 to 2016 season, Formosa Quartet enjoyed a two-year residency with Art of Élan, a San Diego arts-presenting organization. As ensemble-in-residence, Formosa worked with UCSD professor of composition Lei Liang to create a new piece based on the indigenous music of Taiwan. The culmination of the two-year project was the premiere performance of the commission, Song Recollections, and Formosa's 2019 critically acclaimed record album, From Hungary To Taiwan.

Formosa Quartet is passionate about working with next-generation musicians and helped found the annual Formosa Chamber Music Festival, a two-week intensive chamber music training program in Taiwan. The Quartet became the faculty quartet-in-residence at the National Youth Orchestra of Canada in 2014, and has been a returning collaborator with Taiwan Studies / Taiwan Lecture Series at UCSD, with composer Shih-Hui Chen at Rice University, and in week-long residencies of educational and artistic outreach at Eastern Michigan University and The University of California, Los Angeles.

Among venues at which Formosa has performed are the Ravinia Festival, Caramoor Festival, Library of Congress, Da Camera Society of Los Angeles, Chicago Cultural Center, Walter Reade Theater at Lincoln Center, Rice University, San Francisco State University, London's Wigmore Hall, the Kammermusiksaal at the Berliner Philharmonie, and the Korean Cultural Center in Brussels.

Formosa Quartet is represented by BesenArts LLC.

Members 
 Jasmine Lin, violin
 Wayne Lee, violin
 Matthew Cohen, viola
 Deborah Pae, cello

Discography 
 Formosa Quartet. Wolfgang Amadeus Mozart, Franz Schubert, Claude Debussy, Hugo Wolf (EMI Classics)
 Returning Souls. Shih-Hui Chen. (New World Records)
 Gernsheim/Brahms Piano Quintets. Formosa Quartet and Reiko Uchida. (Delos Productions)
 Luminous. Lei Liang. (New World Records)
 From Hungary To Taiwan. Formosa Quartet. (Bridge Records)

References

External links
 Formosa Quartet official website

American string quartets